Rocky Branch or Rockybranch may refer to:

Streams
Rocky Branch (Kennedy Creek tributary), a stream in Kentucky
Rocky Branch (Burris Fork tributary), a stream in Missouri
Rocky Branch (Mineral Fork tributary), a stream in Missouri
Rocky Branch (Panther Creek tributary), a stream in Missouri
Rocky Branch (New Hampshire), a stream in New Hampshire
Rocky Branch (Lanes Creek tributary), a stream in Anson County, North Carolina
Rocky Branch (Deep River tributary), a stream in Chatham County, North Carolina
Rocky Branch (Reedy Fork tributary), a stream in Guilford County, North Carolina

Populated places
Rockybranch, Kentucky, an unincorporated community

Education
Rocky Branch School, Arkansas